Mark Roy Bright (born 29 September 1978) is a New Zealand-born rugby union player who plays for Richmond in the RFU Championship.

Career
Born in Nelson, New Zealand in 1978, Bright was educated at Nelson College from 1992 to 1996. A number eight, he has represented Nelson Bays, Tasman and Cornwall at a provincial or county level, and was a member of the England Sevens team at the 2014 Commonwealth Games in Glasgow. He currently plays for Richmond in the RFU Championship.

References

1978 births
Living people
Rugby union players from Nelson, New Zealand
New Zealand people of Cornish descent
People educated at Nelson College
New Zealand rugby union players
Tasman rugby union players
London Scottish F.C. players
Cornish rugby union players
Rugby union number eights
Male rugby sevens players
Commonwealth Games rugby sevens players of England
Nelson Bays rugby union players
England international rugby sevens players
Rugby sevens players at the 2014 Commonwealth Games